ULBC is an abbreviation that may refer to:
 University of Leicester Boat Club the rowing club of the University of Leicester, England
 University of London Boat Club the rowing club of the University of London